Pedro Manuel Taborda Moreira (born 22 June 1978) is a Portuguese former professional footballer who played as a goalkeeper.

Club career
Taborda was born in Covilhã. In a 20-year senior career, spent mainly in his country's Segunda Liga, he appeared in 68 games in the Primeira Liga, all but one in representation of Associação Naval 1º de Maio from 2005 to 2008; his debut in the competition took place on 21 August 2005 at already 27, when he helped to a 2–0 away win against Vitória S.C. where his team finished with eight players.

Taborda retired in June 2017 at the age of 39, becoming his last club Moreirense FC's goalkeeper coach. He played three and a half seasons in the Romanian Liga I, with FC Politehnica Timișoara and FC Brașov.

Honours
Moreirense
Taça da Liga: 2016–17

References

External links

1978 births
Living people
People from Covilhã
Sportspeople from Castelo Branco District
Portuguese footballers
Association football goalkeepers
Primeira Liga players
Liga Portugal 2 players
Segunda Divisão players
FC Porto players
F.C. Vizela players
Ermesinde S.C. players
S.C. Freamunde players
Associação Naval 1º de Maio players
S.C. Covilhã players
Moreirense F.C. players
Liga I players
FC Politehnica Timișoara players
FC Brașov (1936) players
Portuguese expatriate footballers
Expatriate footballers in Romania
Portuguese expatriate sportspeople in Romania